The 2009 All-Big Ten Conference football team consists of American football players chosen as All-Big Ten Conference players for the 2009 Big Ten Conference football season.  The conference recognizes two official All-Big Ten selectors: (1) the Big Ten conference coaches selected separate offensive and defensive units and named first- and second-team players (the "Coaches" team); and (2) a panel of sports writers and broadcasters covering the Big Ten also selected offensive and defensive units and named first- and second-team players (the "Media" team).

Offensive selections

Quarterbacks
 Daryll Clark, Penn State (Coaches-1; Media-1)
 Mike Kafka, Northwestern (Coaches-2; Media-2)

Running backs
 Evan Royster, Penn State (Coaches-1; Media-1)
 John Clay, Wisconsin (Coaches-1; Media-1)
 Brandon Saine, Ohio State (Coaches-2; Media-2)
 Ralph Bolden, Purdue (Coaches-2; Media-2)

Receivers
 Blair White, Michigan State (Coaches-1; Media-2)
 Tandon Doss, Indiana (Coaches-2; Media-1)
 Keith Smith, Purdue (Coaches-2; Media-1)
 Eric Decker, Minnesota (Coaches-1)
 Derrell Johnson-Koulianos, Iowa (Coaches-2)
 Zeke Markshausen, Northwestern (Media-2)

Centers
 Stefen Wisniewski, Penn State (Coaches-1; Media-1)
 Rafael Eubanks, Iowa (Coaches-2 [tie]; Media-2)
 Joel Nitchman, Michigan State (Coaches-2 [tie])

Guards
 John Moffitt, Wisconsin (Coaches-1; Media-1)
 Dace Richardson, Iowa (Coaches-1; Media-2)
 Justin Boren, Ohio State (Coaches-2; Media-1)
 Jon Asamoah, Illinois (Coaches-2; Media-2)

Tackles
 Bryan Bulaga, Iowa (Coaches-1; Media-1)
 Dennis Landolt, Penn State (Coaches-1; Media-2)
 Gabe Carimi, Wisconsin (Coaches-2; Media-1)
 Rodger Saffold, Indiana (Coaches-2)
 Kyle Calloway, Iowa (Media-2)

Tight ends
 Tony Moeaki, Iowa (Coaches-1; Media-2)
 Garrett Graham, Wisconsin (Coaches-2; Media-1)

Defensive selections

Defensive linemen
 Adrian Clayborn, Iowa (Coaches-1; Media-1)
 Brandon Graham, Michigan (Coaches-1; Media-1)
 O'Brien Schofield, Wisconsin (Coaches-1; Media-1)
 Jared Odrick, Penn State (Coaches-1; Media-2)
 Ryan Kerrigan, Purdue (Coaches-2; Media-1)
 Jammie Kirlew, Indiana (Coaches-2; Media-2)
 Thaddeus Gibson, Ohio State (Coaches-2; Media-2)
 Cameron Heyward, Ohio State (Coaches-2; Media-2)

Linebackers
 Pat Angerer, Iowa (Coaches-1; Media-1)
 Greg Jones, Michigan State (Coaches-1; Media-1)
 NaVorro Bowman, Penn State (Coaches-1; Media-1)
 Ross Homan, Ohio State (Coaches-2; Media-2)
 Sean Lee, Penn State (Coaches-2; Media-2)
 A.J. Edds, Iowa (Coaches-2)
 Josh Hull, Penn State (Media-2)

Defensive backs
 Tyler Sash, Iowa (Coaches-1; Media-1)
 Kurt Coleman, Ohio State (Coaches-1; Media-1)
 Amari Spievey, Iowa (Coaches-1; Media-2)
 Brad Phillips, Northwestern (Coaches-1; Media-2)
 Donovan Warren, Michigan (Coaches-2; Media-1)
 Sherrick McManis, Northwestern (Coaches-2; Media-1)
 David Pender, Purdue (Coaches-2; Media-2)
 Brandon King, Purdue (Coaches-2)
 Jay Valai, Wisconsin (Coaches-2)
 Brett Greenwood, Iowa (Media-2)

Special teams

Kickers
 Brett Swenson, Michigan State (Coaches-1; Media-1)
 Stefan Demos, Northwestern (Coaches-2; Media-2)

Punter
 Zoltan Mesko, Michigan (Coaches-1; Media-1)
 Jeremy Boone, Penn State (Coaches-2; Media-2)

Key
Bold = Consensus first-team selection by both the coaches and media

Coaches = Selected by the Big Ten Conference coaches

Media = Selected by the conference media

See also
 2009 College Football All-America Team

References

All-Big Ten Conference
All-Big Ten Conference football teams